Robert L. Geddins (February 6, 1913 – February 16, 1991) was an American San Francisco Bay Area blues and rhythm and blues musician and record producer.

Geddins was born in Highbank, Texas, United States, a town ten miles south of Marlin, who came to Oakland, California during World War II, and worked there until his 
death of liver cancer in 1991, ten days after his 78th birthday.

Record labels and artists produced
From 1948 onwards, he founded and owned numerous small independent record labels, including Art-Tone, Big Town, Cavatone, Down Town, Irma, Plaid, Rhythm, and Veltone. He also leased his recordings to Los Angeles based labels such as Swing Time, Aladdin, Modern, Imperial, and Fantasy, and also to the Chicago operated Checker label. Geddins produced acts including Lowell Fulson, Jimmy McCracklin, Johnny Fuller, Sugar Pie DeSanto and Etta James. A 4-CD box set of 107 selected recordings has been issued by JSP Records under the title The Bob Geddins Blues Legacy.

Compositions
Many tunes often mistakenly attributed to other artists were either written or co-written by Geddins, e.g. "Tin Pan Alley". "Mercury Blues", and "My Time After A While".

Geddins best-known tune is possibly "Haunted House" (originally produced by Geddins, sung by Johnny Fuller, released in 1958 on Specialty 655) which later became a 1964 US number 11 hit for Jumpin' Gene Simmons and No. 7 in Canada and, subsequently, many other well-known artists.

References

External links
 Bay Area Blues Society homepage: "Bob Geddins, Godfather of Oakland Blues"
 

1913 births
1991 deaths
Record producers from Texas
American music industry executives
People from Falls County, Texas
20th-century American businesspeople